Map of places in Anglsey compiled from this list
 See the list of places in Wales for places in other principal areas.

This is a list of towns and villages in the principal area of Anglesey, Wales.

A
Aberffraw
Amlwch
Amlwch Port

B
Beaumaris
Benllech
Bodedern
Bodewryd
Bodffordd
Bodorgan
Bryn Du
Bryngwran
Brynrefail
Brynteg
Brynsiencyn
Bull Bay
Burwen

C
Caergeiliog
Cemaes Bay
Cemlyn
Capel Coch
Capel Gwyn
Capel Mawr
Capel Parc
Carmel
Carreglefn
Ceidio
Ceirchiog
Cemaes Bay
Cemlyn
Cerrigceinwen
Cerrig Man
Cestyll Garden
Church Bay
Coedana

D
Dwyran
Dulas

E
Engedi
Elim

F
Four Mile Bridge

G
Gaerwen
Gwalchmai
Gwredog

H
Heneglwys
Hermon
Holyhead

L
Llaingoch
Llanallgo
Llanbabo
Llanbadrig
Llanbedrgoch
Llanbeulan
Llanddaniel
Llanddeusant
Llanddona
Llanddwyn
Llandegfan
Llandrygarn
Llandyfrydog
Llandysilio
Llanedwen
Llaneilian
Llanerchymedd
Llanfachraeth
Llanfaelog
Llanfaes
Llanfaethlu
Llanfair Mathafarn Eithaf
Llanfairpwllgwyngyllgogerychwyrndrobwyllllantysiliogogogoch
Llanfairyneubwll
Llanfairynghornwy
Llanfechell
Llanffinan
Llanfflewyn
Llanfihangel Yn Nhywyn
Llanfihangel Tre'r Beirdd
Llanfihangel Ysgeifiog
Llanfugail
Llanfwrog
Llangadwaladr
Llangaffo
Llangefni
Llangeinwen
Llangoed
Llangristiolus
Llangwyfan
Llangwyllog
Llanidan

Llanllibio
Llanrhwydrys
Llanrhyddlad
Llansadwrn, Anglesey
Llantrisant, Anglesey
Llanwenllwyfo
Llanynghenedl
Llaniestyn
Llanynghenedl
LLechcynfarwy
Llechylched
Llynfaes

M
Maenaddfwyn
Malltraeth
Marian Glas
Mechell
Mynydd Mechell
Menai Bridge
Mochdref
Moelfre
Mona

N
Nebo, Anglesey
Newborough, Anglesey

P
Paradwys
Parc
Pencarnisiog
Penygraigwen
Pengorffwysfa
Penmon, Anglesey
Penmynydd
Penrhos
Penrhyd
Pentraeth
Pentre Berw
Pen y Garnedd
Penygraigwen
Penysarn

R
Rhodogeidio
Rhosbeirio
Rhos Cefn Hir
Rhosmeirch
Rhoscolyn
Rhosneigr
Rhostrehwfa
Rhosybol
Rhosgoch
Rhydwyn

S
Star, Anglesey
Soar, Aberffraw

T
Talwrn
Trearddur Bay
Trefdraeth
Trefor
Tregaian
Tregele
Trewalchmai
Tŷ Croes
Tyn-y-Gongl

V
Valley, Anglesey

W
Wern y Wylan

See also
List of places in Anglesey (categorised)
List of Anglesey towns by population

Anglesey